The Guzzini Challenger is a professional tennis tournament played on outdoor hard courts. It is currently part of the ATP Challenger Tour. It is held annually at the Circolo Tennis Francesco Guzzini in Recanati, Italy, since 2003.

Past finals

Singles

Doubles

External links
Official website
ITF Search 

 
ATP Challenger Tour
Hard court tennis tournaments
Tennis tournaments in Italy
Recurring sporting events established in 2003